Perpetual Stroll is an album by the Rufus Reid Trio, a group led by bassist Rufus Reid. It was recorded in 1980 and released on the Theresa label.

Reception

In his review for AllMusic, Scott Yanow observed "Since all three musicians have tended to be underrated through the years, this recording served as a excellent showcase for their often overlooked talents".

Track listing
All compositions by Rufus Reid except as indicated
 "Perpetual Stroll" - 5:57
 "Waltz for Doris" - 7:01
 "One Finger Snap" (Herbie Hancock) - 4:54
 "No Place Is the End of the World" - 9:43
 "Habiba" (Kirk Lightsey) - 6:22
 "Tricrotism" (Oscar Pettiford) - 3:55

Personnel
Rufus Reid - bass
Kirk Lightsey - piano
Eddie Gladden - drums

References

1980 albums
Rufus Reid albums
Theresa Records albums